Kurt Lentjies (born 17 February 1985) is a South African professional soccer coach and former player who both played for and coached Chippa United in the Premier Soccer League.

Honours
2007/08 NFD Coastal Stream Player of the Year

References

External links

1985 births
Living people
Cape Coloureds
Association football midfielders
South African soccer players
Mamelodi Sundowns F.C. players
Maritzburg United F.C. players
Bloemfontein Celtic F.C. players
Sportspeople from Cape Town
SuperSport United F.C. players
Ikapa Sporting F.C. players
Chippa United F.C. players
South African Premier Division players
South African soccer managers
Chippa United F.C. managers
Premier Soccer League managers